The San Luis Southern Railway Trestle, in Costilla County, Colorado near Blanca, Colorado, was built in 1910.  It was listed on the National Register of Historic Places in 2004.

It is a railroad trestle built by the Southern San Luis Valley Railroad.

References

Trestle bridges in the United States
National Register of Historic Places in Costilla County, Colorado
Buildings and structures completed in 1910